Shi Yafeng (March 21, 1919 – February 13, 2011) was Chinese geographer and glaciologist. He was an academician of the Chinese Academy of Sciences. He was an expert on geography and glaciology, and regarded as the "Father of Chinese Glaciology".

Life
Shi was born in Haimen, Jiangsu on March 21, 1919. He did his undergraduate and postgraduate studies both at Zhejiang University. He led the Batoula Glacier Investigation Team, Glaciology and Geocryology Institute of Chinese Academe Science in 1978, which was the first modern Chinese team to systematically investigate glaciers.

He was a researcher, vice-director, director, honorary director of the Lanzhou Glacier Frozen Earth Institute, Chinese Academy of Sciences.

Works
 monograph: Glacier Conspectus of China (Shi et al., 1988)
 monograph: Glaciers and Glacial Geomorphology in China (Shi, 1992)

References

1919 births
2011 deaths
Chinese geographers
Chinese glaciologists
Academic staff of the East China Normal University
Educators from Nantong
Academic staff of Hohai University
Academic staff of Lanzhou University
Members of the Chinese Academy of Sciences
Academic staff of Nanjing Normal University
Academic staff of Nanjing University
People from Haimen
Scientists from Nantong
Zhejiang University alumni